The second season of The Suite Life of Zack & Cody aired on Disney Channel from February 3, 2006 to June 2, 2007.
Zack and Cody Martin are identical twin brothers who move into the Tipton Hotel in Boston with their mother, Carey, where she sings and performs in the lounge. The show also centers in London Tipton, the daughter of the hotel owner, who is very wealthy and ditzy, the hotel's down-to-earth candy-counter girl, Maddie Fitzpatrick, and Mr. Moseby, the strict, dutiful, and serious manager, who is often the foil to Zack and Cody's schemes and has a liking to the piano, pocket hankies and ballet.

This season a lot of returning recurring characters who were introduced in season one return, such as: Adrian R'Mante as Esteban, Charlie Stewart as Bob, Brian Stepanek as Arwin, Monique Coleman as Mary Margaret, Sophie Oda as Barbara, Patrick Bristow as Patrick, Aaron Musicant as Lance, Allie Grant as Agnes, Anthony Acker as Norman, Sharon Jordan as Irene, Alyson Stoner as Max, Gus Hoffman as Warren, Robert Torti as Kurt, Caroline Rhea as Ilsa and Ernie Grunwald as Mr. Forgess.

Alongside the old recurring cast there are also new characters introduced: Camilla & Rebecca Rosso as Jessica and Janice, Bo Crutcher as Skippy, Marianne Muellerleile as Sister Dominick, Vanessa Hudgens as Corrie, Jerry Kernion as Chef Paolo, Sammi Hanratty as Holly, Tyler Steelman as Mark, Brittany Curran as Chelsea, Kaycee Stroh as Leslie and Alexa Nikolas as Tiffany.

Not returning for this season are the following characters: Estelle Harris as Muriel and Dennis Bendersky as Tapeworm.

Special guest stars and notable appearances in this season include: Zac Efron as Trevor, Moises Arias as Randall, D. C. Douglas as Interviewer, Kathryn Joosten as Grandma Marilyn, Raven-Symoné as Raven Baxter, Miley Cyrus as Hannah Montana, Selena Gomez as Gwen, Kumiko Mori as herself, Mindy Sterling as Sister Rose, Cheryl Burke as Shannon, Tahj Mowry as Brandon, Tom Poston as Merle, Nathan Kress as Jamie, Daryl Mitchell as Daryl, The Veronicas as themselves.

Plot
During this new season, we see Zack and Cody on their last year of middle school in Buckner Middle School; and their adventures as Tipton Hotel residents. We also finally see Our Lady of Perpetual Sorrow Catholic School, the school Maddie and Mary Margaret attended during season one, and is now also being attended by London. This season features a special crossover episode titled "That's So Suite Life of Hannah Montana" featuring characters from That's So Raven and Hannah Montana. A one-hour special episode titled "The Suite Life Goes Hollywood" is also a part of this season.

Theme song and opening sequence
The theme song is the same as in the first season with the opening sequence replacing a few scenes from season one with scenes from season two.

Cast

Main cast 
 Dylan Sprouse as Zack Martin
 Cole Sprouse as Cody Martin
 Brenda Song as London Tipton
 Ashley Tisdale as Maddie Fitzpatrick
 Phill Lewis as Mr. Moseby
 Kim Rhodes as Carey Martin

Special guest cast 
 Raven-Symoné as Raven Baxter
 Miley Cyrus as Hannah Montana
 Kumiko Mori as herself

Notable appearances 
 Zac Efron as Trevor
 Moises Arias as Randall
 D. C. Douglas as Interviewer
 Kathryn Joosten as Grandma Marilyn
 Selena Gomez as Gwen
 Mindy Sterling as Sister Rose
 Cheryl Burke as Shannon
 Tahj Mowry as Brandon
 Tom Poston as Merle
 Nathan Kress as Jamie
 Daryl Mitchell as Daryl
 The Veronicas as themselves

Recurring cast 
 Adrian R'Mante as Esteban Ramirez
 Charlie Stewart as Bob
 Brian Stepanek as Arwin Hawkhauser
 Camilla & Rebecca Rosso as Jessica and Janice
 Monique Coleman as Mary Margaret
 Sophie Oda as Barbara Brownstein
 Patrick Bristow as Patrick
 Marianne Muellerleile as Sister Dominick
 Vanessa Hudgens as Corrie
 Aaron Musicant as Lance Fishman
 Allie Grant as Agnes
 Alyson Stoner as Max
 Bo Crutcher as Skippy
 Gus Hoffman as Warren
 Jerry Kernion as Chef Paolo
 Robert Torti as Kurt Martin
 Sammi Hanratty as Holly
 Tyler Steelman as Mark
 Caroline Rhea as Ilsa Shickelgrubermeiger
 Brittany Curran as Chelsea
 Ernie Grunwald as Mr. Forgess
 Kaycee Stroh as Leslie
 Alexa Nikolas as Tiffany

Co-stars 
 Sharon Jordan as Irene
 Anthony Acker as Norman

Episodes

References

External links

 

 *
2006 American television seasons
2007 American television seasons